Dashashwamedh Ghat is a main ghat in Varanasi on the Ganga River in Uttar Pradesh. It is located close to Vishwanath Temple. Two Hindu legends are associated with it: according to one, Brahma created it to welcome Shiva, and in another, Brahma sacrificed ten horses during Dasa-Ashwamedha yajna performed here.

The present ghat was built by Peshwa Balaji Baji Rao in the year 1748. A few decades later, Ahilyabahi Holkar, the Queen of Indore, rebuilt the ghat in the year 1774. Close to the ghat, overlooking the Ganga lies the Jantar Mantar, an observatory built by Maharaja Jai Singh of Jaipur in the year 1737.

Ganga aarti

Ganga Aarti (ritual of offering prayer to the Ganges river) is held daily at dusk. Several priests perform this ritual by carrying deepam and moving it up and down in a rhythmic tune of bhajans. Special aartis are held on Tuesdays and on religious festivals.

The Ganga Aarti starts soon after sunset and lasts for about 45 minutes. In summer the Aarti begins at about 7pm due to late sunsets and in winter it starts at around 6pm. Hundreds of people gather at the ghat every evening to watch the event.

2010 terrorist bombing

On 7 December 2010, a low-intensity blast rocked the southern end of the aarti at the Sitla Ghat. This killed 2 people and injured 37 including 6 foreign tourists, and the Indian Mujahideen claimed responsibility for it.

References

External links

Tourist attractions in Varanasi
Ghats in Varanasi